USS Hawkbill has been the name of more than one United States Navy ship, and may refer to:

, a submarine in commission from 1944 to 1946
, a submarine in commission from 1971 to 2000

United States Navy ship names